The China-U.S. Strategic Economic Dialogue (SED) was a framework for the United States and the People's Republic of China to discuss topics related to economic relations between them. The SED was initiated in 2006 by President George W. Bush and President Hu Jintao. Top leaders of both countries would meet twice a year at locations alternating between China and the US. Five meetings were held between 2006 and 2008, after which the dialogue was upgraded, with the name U.S.–China Strategic and Economic Dialogue.

It had been described by a former U.S. Treasury official as "sort of like the G2". The SED was expanded to give the U.S. State Department a bigger role by the Presidency of Barack Obama, and renamed  the U.S.-China Strategic and Economic Dialogue. After each meeting a jointly-drafted and agreed-to "Fact Sheet" detailing all the agreements reached was produced.

Meetings
First meeting: December 14–15, 2006 (Beijing)
Second meeting: May 22–23, 2007 (Washington, DC)
Third meeting: December 12–13, 2007 (Beijing)
Fourth meeting: June 17–18, 2008 (Annapolis, MD)
Fifth meeting: December 4–5, 2008 (Beijing)

Representatives
United States Secretary of the Treasury: Henry Paulson (2006-2009)
Vice Premier of the People's Republic of China: Wu Yi (2006-2008)
Vice Premier of the People's Republic of China: Wang Qishan (2008-2009)

See also
 Sino-American relations
 Senior Dialogue
 Chinese Intelligence Operations in the United States
 US-China University Presidents Roundtable

References

China–United States economic relations